Moneta is an unincorporated community in Fremont County, Wyoming, United States. It is also located close to the geographic center of the state.

History
As the Chicago and North Western Transportation Company built a line west from Casper in 1905-06, Moneta was made a stop (about 82.6 miles west of Casper),(28 December 1905) Rail Road News Notes, Natrona County Tribune and was laid out in 1906. It was named after Moneta, Iowa. A post office was established in Moneta in 1906, and remained in operation until it was discontinued in 1972.

In 2002, the vehicle in the "Lil' Miss murder" was uncovered in Moneta after DNA evidence linked the landowner, Dale Wayne Eaton, to the murder of Lisa Kimmell. Following a civil suit in which Eaton's land was given to Kimmell's parents, the buildings on the property were burned to the ground.

References

Unincorporated communities in Wyoming
Unincorporated communities in Fremont County, Wyoming
Populated places established in 1906
1906 establishments in Wyoming